The Joplin Carnegie Library is a historic Carnegie library located at Joplin, Jasper County, Missouri. It was built in 1902, and is a two-story, Classical Revival style steel frame building sheathed in brick and white Carthage marble.  It measures 79 feet by 86 feet and features a pedimented Ionic order porch which is distyle in antis. A four-bay two story addition was added in 1916.  Andrew Carnegie provided $40,000 for its construction.

It was listed on the National Register of Historic Places in 1979.

References

Library buildings completed in 1902
Libraries on the National Register of Historic Places in Missouri
Neoclassical architecture in Missouri
Government buildings completed in 1902
Buildings and structures in Joplin, Missouri
Carnegie libraries in Missouri
National Register of Historic Places in Jasper County, Missouri